The 47th Infantry Regiment is an infantry regiment of the United States Army.  Constituted in 1917 at Camp Syracuse, New York, the regiment fought in the Great War, and was later inactivated in 1921. Reactivated in 1940, the regiment fought during World War II in North Africa, Sicily, and Western Europe, then was inactivated in 1946. During the Cold War, the regiment saw multiple activations and inactivations, with service both in the Regular Army and the Army Reserve; it fought in Vietnam. Ultimately it was reactivated as a training regiment, and as of 1999, it has been assigned to Fort Benning and consists of two active battalions.

History

The Great War

The regiment was formed from a cadre from the 9th Infantry Regiment; the regiment was organized at Camp Syracuse on 1 June 1917, almost two months after the American entry into World War I. Initially assigned to Major General George H. Cameron's 4th Division, it fought in Europe during the Great War; within the division the regiment was part of Brigadier General Benjamin Andrew Poore's 7th Infantry Brigade. By May 1918, the regiment arrived at Brest, France, training until July. In late July, the regiment along with the rest of the 7th Infantry Brigade, was briefly attached to the VII French Army Corps near Bois du Chitelet; it was then sent to bolster the beleaguered 42nd Division at Ourcq. In early August, the regiment fought near Bazoches-sur-Vesles during the Second Battle of the Marne. In September and October 1918, the regiment fought near Cuisy, Septsarges, and Brieulles-sur-Meuse; during this period of time Colonel Troy H. Middleton took command of the regiment, having previously commanded the regiment's 1st Battalion.

It ended the war near Fays, Vosges, and served in the Army of Occupation near Koblenz until July 1919. Following the Great War, the army contracted in size; due to this downsizing, the regiment was inactivated in 1921. Although inactivated, the regiment was relieved of its assignment to the 7th Infantry Brigade in 1927, and reassigned to the 13th Infantry Brigade, which was part of the 7th Division.

World War II

In August 1940, the regiment was reassigned away from the 7th Infantry Division and into the 9th Infantry Division, and was then activated at Fort Bragg. Initially, it was commanded by Colonel Alexander Patch; after the attack on Pearl Harbor, Patch was reassigned to the Pacific Theater of Operations. In November 1942, the regiment took part in Operation Blackstone in North Africa, where it fought against Vichy French forces during an amphibious landing; the regiment's Company K were the first American troops to land in French Morocco. At the time of the regiment was commanded by Colonel Edwin Randle.

Still in North Africa, along with the rest of the 9th Division, the regiment fought in the Battle of El Guettar, which resulted in a significant number of casualties; for actions during the battle, the regiment's commander, received the Distinguished Service Cross (he would later go on to be promoted to be the assistant division commander of the 77th Division). Following El Guettar, the regiment moved north, and fought in the Battle of Sedjenane, and soldiers of the regiment's 2d Battalion, were the first Allied soldiers in Bizerte. After Colonel Patch was promoted and parted ways with the regiment, Colonel George W. Smythe became the regiment's commander. Along with the rest of the 9th Infantry Division, the regiment was sent to Sicily, in 1943; in Sicily the regiment was tangentially involved during the Battle of Troina, which saw the 9th Infantry Division's other infantry regiments in significant combat.

Remaining in Sicily after the Axis forces retreated, the regiment received orders to move in November 1943, making its way to England; with the rest of the 9th Infantry Division, the regiment trained until June 1944. The division was garrisoned around Winchester and during this time a number of personnel married local women. While stationed around Alresford, the regiment adopted a dog as a mascot, but it died when struck by a vehicle in May 1944.

On 10 June, four days after D-Day, the 9th Infantry Division landed at Utah Beach. Assigned to VII Corps, it was allocated to the liberation of the Cotentin Peninsula and was the division that sealed off the peninsula to prevent additional German reinforcements from breaking through. Medical supplies for the regiment had been lost during its movement from England to Normandy, but were replaced and captured German vehicles were pressed into service by the regiment's medical detachment. By 14 June, the entire regiment had landed, and the following day the 47th began combat operations, fighting alongside regiments of the 82nd Airborne Division, attacking along a path which was near, or included, Orglandes, Hautteville-Bocage, and Ste. Colombe. The regiment reached Saint-Lô-d'Ourville, via Saint-Sauveur-le-Vicomte, Saint-Sauveur-de-Pierrepont, and Neuville-en-Beaumont, by 18 June.

Relieved by the 357th Infantry Regiment (of the 90th Infantry Division) along the English Channel, facing Jersey, the regiment moved to Saint-Jacques-de-Néhou where it began its push northward to Vasteville, via Bricquebec; on 20 June it began its push towards Cherbourg, but was initially halted near Sideville by stiff German prepared defenses around the outskirts of the port city. On 22 June, the attack on Cherbourg began, with the regiment errantly being attacked by aircraft of the IX Bomber Command, and the 39th Infantry Regiment following behind its advancement; by the 24th the regiment had broken through the enemy defenses, and along with the 39th, where fighting within the suburb of Octeville. The regiment continued to fight in the western portion of Cherbourg, and by the 26th it captured German General Karl-Wilhelm von Schlieben and Admiral Walter Hennecke. The city fell to the Allies by the next day; following the liberation of the port city, along with the 60th Infantry Regiment, the 47th fought the remaining German forces in Cap de la Hague, ultimately capturing over 6,000 Germans by 1 July.

By 10 July, the 9th Infantry Division was tasked to join the effort to liberate Saint-Lô; the next day it was attacked by the Panzer Lehr Division. On 11 July, wounded men and medical officers of the regiment's third battalion, were captured by German forces; one of the medical officers would later be killed by friendly fire and buried at Aisne-Marne American Cemetery and Memorial, while the other was liberated at Château-Thierry while taking care of wounded prisoners of war. In early August the regiment, along with the 60th Infantry Regiment, was fighting in the area of Gathemo. The liberation of Château-Thierry occurred on 27 August, while the 9th Infantry Division was following the wake of the movement of the 3d Armored Division.

On 14 September, the regiment entered Germany, at or near, Roetgen; it was the first German city to fall to the Allies. The regiment penetrated the Siegfried Line near Schevenhütte on 16 September. This was followed by fighting in the Hürtgen Forest; during the battle the regiment captured Frenzerburg Castle. By 30 September, the regiment had lost 163 officers; one company alone lost 18 officers killed, leading to a loss of experienced leadership over time. During the Battle of the Bulge, the regiment served as a cornerstone of American resistance around Eupen. The regiment had the distinction of another first; on 8 March 1945, soldiers of the regiment became the first infantry troops to cross the Rhine River, doing so at Remagen; for its actions during the crossing of the Rhine, the regiment was awarded a Distinguished Unit Citation. During March the regiment experienced multiple changes in command, at the beginning of the month Colonel Smythe departed the regiment, leaving Lieutenant Colonel Herman A. Schmidt to act as the regiment's commanding officer, only to be succeeded by Colonel Peter O. Ward a week later.

By early April, the 9th Infantry Division was assigned to III Corps, and was part of the effort against the Ruhr Pocket; once again the Panzer Lehr Division attacked the 9th Infantry Division. For its actions in repelling the attack the regiment earned another Distinguished Unit Citation. By mid-April 1945, the 9th Infantry Division was reassigned to VII Corps, and fought against remaining German forces in the Harz Mountains; there they encountered concentration camps near Nordhausen. After the Germans surrendered, the regiment conducted occupation duty in Germany, which lasted until late 1946; part of the duty included a stint at the Dachau Concentration Camp. In December 1946, the regiment was deactivated in Germany.

Cold War
In July 1947 the regiment was reactivated at Fort Dix. In 1957, the regiment was reorganized into the Combat Arms Regimental System. In 1957, the regiment's 2d Battalion was relieved from the 9th Infantry Division, returning to assignment with the 4th Infantry Division. Also 1957, the regiment's 3d Battalion was inactivated and relieved from the 9th Infantry Division, and two years later allotted to the United States Army Reserves' 81st Infantry Division.

In 1961, the regiment's 2nd Battle Group (the redesignated 2d Battalion) was deployed to Germany. Stationed in Berlin, the regiment remained there for a year; the following year the regiment's 2d Battalion was inactivated at Fort Lewis, and the 3d Battalion was inactivated at Atlanta. In July 1963, the 1st Battalion was reactivated as a part of the 171st Infantry Brigade. In 1966, at Fort Riley, both the 2d and 3d Battalions were reactivated, with the 3d Battalion being reassigned to 9th Infantry Division.

Vietnam
In Vietnam, the regiment fought in the Mekong Delta, where it conducted riverine warfare. Along with other units assigned to the 9th Infantry Division, the regiment was based out of Đồng Tâm Base Camp; however, the regiment's 3d Battalion was based in Kiến Hòa province. In addition to riverine operations, the regiment also conducted air mobile operations.

During the conflict three of the regiment's battalions served; the 2d Battalion was deployed from January 1967 until October 1970, the 3d Battalion was deployed from January 1967 until July 1969, and the 4th Battalion was deployed January 1967 until July 1969. For the most part the regiment's battalions were assigned to the 9th Infantry Division's 2d Brigade, except for the 2d Battalion, which was temporarily assigned at various times in 1968 to the division's other two brigades. During its time in Vietnam, the regiment conducted joint operations with the United States Navy, during which its soldiers deployed from, and billeted aboard, naval vessels.

In 1966, upon learning of the regiment's upcoming riverine mission, the regiment's leadership worked with the Navy's Amphibious Training School, in Coronado, to gain the skills needed for the expected deployment. In January 1967, the regiment deployed from Fort Riley, by way of San Francisco, disembarking at Vũng Tàu. In April and May 1967, the regiment's 4th Battalion conducted operations in the Rung Sat Special Zone.

Beginning in April 1967, the regiment's 3d Battalion deployed to the Mekong Delta proper. By May of that same year it began to conduct combat operations near Ap Bac; that same month, the regiment's 4th Battalion completed operations in Rung Sat and began operations in the Mekong Delta. On 19 May 1967,  the 2d Brigade's headquarters came under attack on the banks of the Mỹ Tho River, and the regiment's 3d Battalion was heavily engaged in thwarting the attack. In June 1967, the regiment took part in Operation Concordia, with the  providing medical support. In early July 1967, operations were conducted in the Gò Công Province; at the end of that month, the regiment moved to Can Guioc. In August, and early September, the regiment operated in the Long An Province, supporting units from the Republic of Vietnam Marine Division.

During the Tet Offensive, in early February, the regiment fought heavily in and around Mỹ Tho in Operation Coronado X. From mid-February and into early March, the regiment took part in Operation Coronado XI. Following that operation, the regiment took part in Operation Truong Cong Dinh until April. Several helicopters were lost due to enemy fire, and two artillery barges sunk; the Benewah was struck by enemy fire, and one LCM was sunk. In July, the regiment's 4th Battalion conducted operations with the South Vietnamese Army's 9th Division. In October, two of the regiment's battalions conducted pacification operations in Kiến Hòa province.

Post-Vietnam and 21st century
Following the regiment's deployment to Vietnam, its battalions were progressively inactivated. The 3d Battalion was the first to be inactivated, doing so at Fort Riley in August 1969; this was followed by the 2d Battalion, which was inactivated at Fort Lewis in October 1970, and the 1st Battalion in November 1972. This period of inactivation was short lived, as the 2d Battalion was reactivated at Fort Lewis in November 1972, while the 3d Battalion was reactivated at the same base in March 1973. During the remainder of the 1970s and into the late 1980s, the 2d and 3d Battalions remained with the 9th Infantry Division. although, the regiment was withdrawn from the Combat Arms Regimental System and was reorganized into the United States Army Regimental System. This process continued until August 1988 when the 2d Battalion was inactivated again. In 1991, the 9th Infantry Division was inactivated; due to this the 3d Battalion was assigned to the 199th Infantry Brigade, but was later inactivated in January 1994 at Fort Polk.

In April 1996, the regiment was transferred to the United States Army Training and Doctrine Command. From the regiment's transfer to Training and Doctrine Command, until February 1999, the regiment was stationed at Fort Leonard Wood; beginning in March 1999 the regiment has been stationed at Fort Benning. , 2d Battalion, 47th Infantry Regiment is stationed at Sand Hill; the battalion falls under the 194th Armored Brigade, and Maneuver Center of Excellence. On 8 April 2013, an inactivation ceremony was held for the 3d Battalion, 47th Infantry Regiment, resulting in a reduction of 44 soldier and 27 civilian positions. On 4 March 2019, 3d Battalion was re-activated in the 198th Infantry Brigade for infantry one station unit training.

Regimental lineage
The regiment's lineage is as follows:
Constituted 15 May 1917 in the Regular Army as the 47th Infantry
Organized 1 June 1917 at Syracuse, New York
Assigned 19 November 1917 to the 4th Division
Inactivated 22 September 1921 at Camp Lewis, Washington
Relieved 15 August 1927 from assignment to the 4th Division and assigned to the 7th Division
Relieved 1 October 1933 from assignment to the 7th Division
Assigned 1 August 1940 to the 9th Division (later redesignated as the 9th Infantry Division)
Activated 10 August 1940 at Fort Bragg, North Carolina
Inactivated 31 December 1946 in Germany
Activated 15 July 1947 at Fort Dix, New Jersey
Relieved 1 December 1957 from assignment to the 9th Infantry Division and reorganized as a parent regiment under the Combat Arms Regimental System
Withdrawn 16 June 1986 from the Combat Arms Regimental System and reorganized under the United States Army Regimental System
Transferred 15 April 1996 to the United States Army Training and Doctrine Command

Honors
The regiment's campaign participation credits, and decorations, are as follows:

Campaign participation credit

World War I: Aisne-Marne; St. Mihiel; Meuse-Argonne; Champagne 1918; Lorraine 1918

World War II: Algeria-French Morocco (with arrowhead); Tunisia; Sicily; Normandy; Northern France; Rhineland; Ardennes-Alsace; Central Europe

Vietnam: Counteroffensive, Phase II; Counteroffensive, Phase III; Tet Counteroffensive; Counteroffensive, Phase IV; Counteroffensive, Phase V; Counteroffensive, Phase VI; Tet 69/Counteroffensive; Summer-Fall 1969; Winter-Spring 1970; Sanctuary Counteroffensive; Counteroffensive, Phase VII

Decorations
Presidential Unit Citation (Army) for Cherbourg
Presidential Unit Citation (Army) for Hague Peninsula 
Presidential Unit Citation (Army) for Wilhelmshoe, Germany 
Presidential Unit Citation (Army) for Roetgen, Germany 
Presidential Unit Citation (Army) for Nothberg, Germany 
Presidential Unit Citation (Army) for Freuzenbeg Castle
Presidential Unit Citation (Army) for Remagen, Germany 
Presidential Unit Citation (Army) for Oberkirchen, Germany
Presidential Unit Citation (Army) for Mekong Delta
Valorous Unit Award for Long Binh – Bien Hoa
Valorous Unit Award for Saigon
Valorous Unit Award for Fish Hook
Meritorious Unit Commendation (Army) for Vietnam 1968
French Croix de Guerre with Palm, World War II for Cherbourg
Belgian Fourragere 1940
Cited in the Order of the Day of the Belgian Army for action at the Meuse River
Cited in the Order of the Day of the Belgian Army for action in the Ardennes

See also

Medal of Honor recipients
Specialist Four Edward A. DeVore Jr.  Vietnam War
Private First Class James W. Fous  Vietnam War
Specialist Four George C. Lang  Vietnam War
Sergeant William Shemin  World War I
Private First Class Carl V. Sheridan  World War II

Notes

References

Further reading
 Biography of a World War II surgeon of the 47th Infantry

External links
 2nd Battalion, 47th Infantry Regiment Website
 47th Infantry Regiment Tribute, 9th Infantry Division in World War II
 47th Infantry Regiment in World War II
 Hambone Junior and Company

1917 establishments in New York (state)
Infantry regiments of the United States Army
Infantry regiments of the United States Army in World War II
Military units and formations established in 1917
Military units and formations of the United States Army in the Vietnam War
United States Army regiments of World War I